Coryphella verta is a species of sea slug, an aeolid nudibranch, a marine gastropod mollusc in the family Coryphellidae.

Distribution
This species was described from Brazil. It has been reported from Florida.

Description 
The maximum recorded body length is 21 mm.

Ecology 
Minimum recorded depth is 1 m. Maximum recorded depth is 30 m.

References

External links

Coryphellidae
Gastropods described in 1970
Taxa named by Eveline Du Bois-Reymond Marcus